Maltagliati are a type of pasta product typical to the Emilia-Romagna region of Italy.

In the manufacture of pasta such as tagliatelle, dough is rolled and then cut into thin strips, producing noodles. The excess parts of the dough, generally the edges, are left with irregular shape and thickness, therefore "poorly cut" or in Italian, maltagliati.  Maltagliati are therefore cut from such scrap pieces of pasta, and differ in shape, size and thickness.

As probable food for the poor, recipes for maltagliati generally call for simple, inexpensive ingredients. The most classic use of maltagliati is in bean soup, but there are several other recipes involving them.

Maltagliati are not the only pasta traditionally made with dough scraps.  Strozzapreti, a dish from Romagna, is not cut as maltagliati but rolled in the palms, producing elongated flute shapes of pasta.  The legend of Strozzapreti relates to the mandatory tithe to the local clergy. According to the legend, Romagnaese housewives, as they manufactured this pasta may have noted, "With what could we strangle (strozza) the priest?"

Origin

Modern matlagliati show a close resemblance to those known from literary sources of ancient Roman and Greek times. This could be a hint of their origin.

References

Types of pasta